Nicholas O'Neill may refer to:
 Nicholas O'Neill (composer) (born 1970), English composer
 Nicholas O'Neill (writer) (1985–2003), American writer